Stéphane Testé is a French politician of La République En Marche! (LREM) who has been serving as a member of the French National Assembly since the 2017 elections, representing the 12th constituency of the department of Seine-Saint-Denis.

Career
In parliament, Testé serves as member of the Committee on Cultural Affairs and Education. In addition to his committee assignments, he is part of the French-Turkish Parliamentary Friendship Group.

In July 2019, Testé decided not to align with his parliamentary group's majority and became one of 52 LREM members who abstained from a vote on the French ratification of the European Union’s Comprehensive Economic and Trade Agreement (CETA) with Canada.

See also
 2017 French legislative election

References

Year of birth missing (living people)
Living people
Deputies of the 15th National Assembly of the French Fifth Republic
La République En Marche! politicians
Place of birth missing (living people)